Pam Sorenson (born March 3, 1986) is a female American mixed martial artist who competes in Featherweight division of Bellator MMA. She has previously competed in Invicta Fighting Championships, where she is the former Invicta FC Featherweight Championship. As of September 27, 2022, she is #5 in the Bellator Women's Featherweight Rankings.

Background
Sorenson was born in Blaine, Minnesota, United States. She started picked up kickboxing class to lose weight after suffering a period of depression due to a passing of her best friend. Sorenson began competing in kickboxing shortly later.

Mixed martial arts career

Early career
Sorenson started her professional mixed martial arts career in 2015. She fought all her fights under King of the Cage promotion prior joined Invicta Fighting Championships, amassing a record of 4-1.

Invicta Fighting Championships
Sorenson made her promotional debut on November 18, 2016, at Invicta FC 20: Evinger vs. Kunitskaya against Jessica-Rose Clark. She won the fight via split decision.

Her next fight was on May 20, 2017, at Invicta FC 23: Porto vs. Niedźwiedź.  She faced Ediane Gomes in a featherweight bout and she lost the fight in split decision.

On July 15, 2017, Sorenson faced Helena Kolesnyk  at Invicta FC 24: Dudieva vs. Borella. She won the via a submission in round one.

Alpha One Sports 
Sorenson  faced Jan Finney on November 22, 2018, at Alpha One Sports: IT Fight Series 77. She won the fight via split decision.

The Ultimate Fighter 28 
Sorenson participated tryout in the Ultimate Fighting Championships (UFC) TV series The Ultimate Fighter 28 for the females featherweight weight class in 2018. However, she failed to make it as one of the cast in the program.

Return to Invicta Fighting Championships
After one-year hiatus, Sorenson returned to Invicta and faced Felicia Spencer on November 16, 2018, at Invicta FC 32: Spencer vs. Sorenson for the vacant Invicta FC Featherweight Championship. She lost the fight via a rear-naked choke in round four.

Sorenson faced Kaitlin Young on August 9, 2019, at Invicta FC 36: Sorenson vs. Young for the vacant Invicta FC Featherweight Championship after former champion Felicia Spencer signed with the UFC. Sorenson won the fight and the title in a five round unanimous decision.

Bellator MMA 
On July 13, 2021, Sorenson announced that she was released from Invicta FC, upon her request, and in the process vacated the title. Soon after it was announced that she had signed a multi-fight deal with Bellator MMA.

Sorenson faced Roberta Paim Samad on August 13, 2021, at Bellator 264. She won the bout via split decision.

Sorenson faced Arlene Blencowe on November 12, 2021, at Bellator 271. She lost the bout via unanimous decision.

Sorenson was scheduled to face Cat Zingano on March 11, 2022, at Bellator 276.  However, Zingano was forced to pull out due to injury and the bout was cancelled. The bout was rebooked for Bellator 282 on June 24, 2022. She lost the bout via unanimous decision.

Sorenson is scheduled to face promotional newcomer Sara Collins on March 31, 2023, at Bellator 293.

Championships and accomplishments

Mixed martial arts 

 Invicta Fighting Championships
 Invicta FC Featherweight Championship (One time)
King of the Cage
 KOTC Women's Bantamweight Championship (One time)

Mixed martial arts record

|-
| Loss
|align=center| 9–5
|Cat Zingano
| Decision (unanimous)
|Bellator 282
|
|align=center|3
|align=center|5:00
|Uncasville, Connecticut, United States
|
|-
| Loss
| align=center| 9–4
| Arlene Blencowe
| Decision (unanimous)
| Bellator 271
| 
| align=center| 3
| align=center| 5:00
| Hollywood, Florida, United States
|
|-
| Win
| align=center| 9–3
|Roberta Paim Samad
|Decision (split)
|Bellator 264
|
|align=center|3
|align=center|5:00
|Uncasville, Connecticut, United States
|
|-
| Win
| align=center| 8–3
| Kaitlin Young
| Decision (unanimous) 
| Invicta FC 36: Sorenson vs. Young
| 
| align=center| 5
| align=center| 5:00
| Kansas City, Kansas, United States
| Won the vacant Invicta FC Featherweight Championship
|-
| Loss
| align=center| 7–3
|Felicia Spencer
| Submission (rear-naked choke) 
| Invicta FC 32: Spencer vs. Sorenson
| 
| align=center| 4
| align=center| 4:23
| Kansas City, Missouri, United States
| For the vacant Invicta FC Featherweight Championship
|-
| Win
| align=center| 7–2
| Jan Finney
| Decision (split) 
| Alpha One Sports: IT Fight Series 77
| 
| align=center| 3
| align=center| 5:00
| Bellefontaine, Ohio, United States
|
|-
| Win
| align=center| 6–2
| Helena Kolesnyk
| Submission (armbar)
| Invicta FC 24: Dudieva vs. Borella
| 
| align=center| 1
| align=center| 3:12
| Kansas City, Missouri, United States
|
|-
| Loss
| align=center| 5–2
| Ediane Gomes
| Decision (split) 
| Invicta FC 23: Porto vs. Niedźwiedź
| 
| align=center| 3
| align=center| 5:00
| Kansas City, Missouri, United States
|
|-
| Win
| align=center| 5–1
|Jessica-Rose Clark
| Decision (split) 
| Invicta FC 20: Evinger vs. Kunitskaya
| 
| align=center| 3
| align=center| 5:00
| Kansas City, Missouri, United States
|
|-
| Win
| align=center| 4–1
| Christina Barry
| Decision (split)
| KOTC: Due Process
| 
| align=center| 3
| align=center| 2:45
| Carlton, Minnesota, United States
|
|-
| Win
| align=center| 3–1
| Brenda Gonzales
| Decision (unanimous)
| KOTC: Natural Instinct
| 
| align=center| 5
| align=center| 5:00
| Lac du Flambeau, Wisconsin, United States
|
|-
| Loss
| align=center| 2–1
| Shanna Young
| Decision (split)
| KOTC: Generation X
| 
| align=center| 5
| align=center| 5:00
| Kansas City, Missouri, United States
|
|-
| Win
| align=center| 2–0
| Nicco Montaño
| Decision (split)
| KOTC: Frozen War
| 
| align=center| 3
| align=center| 5:00
| Walker, Minnesota, United States
|
|-
| Win
| align=center| 1–0
| Moriel Charneski
| Decision (split)
| KOTC: Bear Brawl
| 
| align=center| 3
| align=center| 5:00
| Carlton, Minnesota, United States
|
|-

See also
 List of current Bellator fighters
List of female mixed martial artists

References

External links
 
 Pam Sorenson at Invicta FC

Living people
1986 births
Sportspeople from Minnesota
American female mixed martial artists
American female kickboxers
American practitioners of Brazilian jiu-jitsu
Female Brazilian jiu-jitsu practitioners
Featherweight mixed martial artists
Mixed martial artists utilizing kickboxing
Mixed martial artists utilizing Brazilian jiu-jitsu
Mixed martial artists from Minnesota
21st-century American women